Paipharob Kokietgym (born May 5, 1983) is a Thai professional boxer in the strawweight division and is the former interim World Boxing Association (WBA) strawweight champion.

He was arrested on suspicion of trafficking Yaba in Lop Buri on January 8, 2012. He was subsequently stripped of his title in May 2012 by the WBA due to his legal issues and apparent inability to make a defense.

References

External links

|-

1983 births
Living people
Mini-flyweight boxers
Paipharob Kokietgym
Paipharob Kokietgym